The Greene Thomas House is a historic house in rural Searcy County, Arkansas.  It is located north of Leslie, on the west side of County Road 74 south of its junction with County Road 55.  It is a single-story stone structure, fashioned out of smooth rounded creek stones.  It has a front-facing gable roof with an extended gable supported by large brackets, and a porch with a similar gable, supported by sloping square wooden columns.  Built in 1930, it is a fine regional example of Craftsman style architecture in a rural context.

The house was listed on the National Register of Historic Places in 1993.

See also
National Register of Historic Places listings in Searcy County, Arkansas

References

Houses on the National Register of Historic Places in Arkansas
Houses completed in 1930
Houses in Searcy County, Arkansas
National Register of Historic Places in Searcy County, Arkansas
1930 establishments in Arkansas